Taylor Regional Hospital (TRH) is located in Campbellsville, Kentucky. TRH is a 90-bed facility with services including an emergency care Level III Trauma Center, cardiac catheterization and rehabilitation, 24-hour physician-staffed emergency services, 24-hour teleradiography services, mobile medical resonance imaging, obstetrics, orthopedics, a cancer treatment center.

Service area
Taylor Regional Hospital (TRH) services 110,000 people who live in Campbellsville, Kentucky and the regional area.

Trauma center
TRH is a Level III trauma center.  In 1995, Taylor Regional Hospital was affiliated with Jewish Hospital HealthCare Services.

Key services
 Emergency Care
 Cancer Services
 Orthopedic Care
 Pulmonary Rehab Program
 Rehab Services-Frazier Rehab
 Spinal Cord Medicine Program
 Wound Healing Center

Organization
Taylor Regional Hospital is listed as a member hospital on the KentuckyOne Health website. KentuckyOne Health is a division of the national non-profit health system Catholic Health Initiatives.

History of Taylor Regional Hospital 
Taylor Regional Hospital, formerly known as Taylor County Hospital and Rosary Hospital, dates back to 1968. The hospital was originally owned by the Dominican Order of St. Catherine and was called Rosary hospital until it was sold to the Taylor County Hospital District. In 1972, construction and renovation began on the hospital. Significant growth of the hospital led to the renaming of the hospital on July 11th, 2003 to Taylor Regional Hospital. The hospital has provided service to its growing community since.

Economic Importance to Community 
The Taylor Regional Hospital has continued to play a major influential role in the economy of its surrounding community. In 2016,  the hospital spent nearly $46.6 million on wages and salaries and purchases of supplies and services. Their Statewide Uncompensated Care cost reached to $1.24 million. According to data compiled in October 2018, employees generated $2.9 million in sales and income taxes. Through the community, the hospital generates $11.3 million from purchases from local companies and the hospital's employees also spend an annual average of $13.2 million in local purchases.  Also, the hospital paid 702,000 in city and county occupational taxes.

Community Engagement 
In 2013, the Taylor Regional Hospital created a foundation that provides philanthropic opportunities that support the hospital in its efforts to improve the health of the community.  The hospital also has a very strong Auxiliary Volunteer program that has various service positions throughout the hospital. These positions include the Gift Shop, Information Desk & Greeter, Clinical Service Areas, and Community Outreach. The same volunteer organization produced the "Tree of Life" within the hospital. This refers to donations made by members of the community who chose to honor or memorialize someone with three levels of donations that correspond to different parts of the tree. In addition to the "Tree of Life", the Walk of Hope was also created to fundraise the hospital through community action and donation.

Employment
Taylor Regional Hospital is the second largest employer in Campbellsville and Taylor County, Kentucky with over 700 employees.

References

Hospitals in Kentucky